Newlands Quay in Wapping, London, is a group of dwellings that is Grade II listed by Historic England. It was built in 1986–88 adjacent to the Shadwell Basin and designed by the architecture firm of MacCormac Jamieson Prichard and Wright.

References 

Grade II listed buildings in the London Borough of Tower Hamlets
Postmodern architecture in the United Kingdom